Ohio Central Railroad may refer to:
Ohio Central Railroad System, acquired by Genesee and Wyoming in 2008
Ohio Central Railroad (1988), one part of the system, operating a former Wheeling and Lake Erie Railway line between Warwick and Zanesville
Ohio Central Railroad (1879–1885), predecessor of the New York Central Railroad
Central Ohio Railroad (1847–1915), predecessor of the Baltimore and Ohio Railroad